Extraordinary is a British superhero comedy television series created by Emma Moran. It was released on the Disney+ Star platform internationally, Star+ in the Latin America and Hulu in the United States, on 25 January 2023. The series was renewed for a second season on 23 January 2023, ahead of the series premiere.

Cast

Main
 Máiréad Tyers as Jen, a 25 year old costume shop worker who doesn't have any super powers and struggles to deal with it.
 Sofia Oxenham as Carrie, Jen's best friend and flatmate who can channel spirits. She works at a legal firm and is dating Kash.
 Bilal Hasna as Kash, Carrie's boyfriend and Jen's other flatmate. He can rewind time by ten seconds and has aspirations of being a serious superhero.
 Luke Rollason as Jizzlord, a shapeshifter who was stuck as a cat for several years. Jen adopted (and named) him before learning what he was but allowed him to stay when it was revealed he had no memory of his previous life.

Supporting

Episodes

Production
Emma Moran developed Extraordinary while completing her Master of Arts in Screenwriting at the University of Manchester, from which she graduated in 2020. Alongside Wedding Season, Extraordinary was on the first slate of UK productions to be commissioned by Disney+ under the Star brand, as announced in April 2021. Sally Woodward Gentle, Lee Morris, and Charles Dawson of Sid Gentle Films as well as Johanna Devereaux of Disney+ executive produced the series. Charlie Palmer served as producer.

The cast were announced in December 2021, with Máiréad Tyers set to lead the series alongside Sofia Oxenham, Bilal Hasna, and Luke Rollason. Also joining the cast were Siobhán McSweeney, Safia Oakley-Green, and Robbie Gee. Principal photography took place in London.

Release
First look images were released in November 2022, followed by a trailer in December.

Reception
For the first season, Rotten Tomatoes reported an approval rating of 100% based on 21 reviews, with an average rating of 7.2/10. The website's critics consensus reads, "Amiable and cleverly constructed, Extraordinary grounds the fantastical and makes it all the more accessible and thrilling as a result."

References

External links
 

2020s British comedy television series
2023 British television series debuts
British superhero television series
English-language television shows
Star (Disney+) original programming
Superhero comedy television series
Television series by BBC Studios
Television shows set in London